.cpt is a filename extension denoting one of several different kinds of files:

 A graphics file format used by some versions of Corel Photo Paint. It is also possible to open CPT version 6 files with IrfanView, but not with Paint Shop Pro (although it is from Corel). CPT version 6 is an almost identical copy of the TIFF format, whereas since Corel Photo-Paint 7.0 (released in 1997), this was deprecated for a new proprietary format (known as CPT7), however the user can still export the older TIFF-based CPT6 files. Chasys Draw IES can open CPT7 files as well as CPT8 and the latest CPT9; this support is available as from Chasys Draw IES version 4.58.01 . Corel Photo Paint is not released as a standalone program. It is part of the Corel Draw Graphics Suite, available only for Windows.

 The .cpt extension is used for files encrypted using ccrypt.

 .cpt is used for screen captures in the video game Tekken Tag Tournament (PlayStation 2), which are saved to the Memory Card.

 .cpt was a filename extension used by a popular software data compression utility named Compact Pro in pre-OS X operating systems for Macintosh. A PC version was also available, ExtractorPC. Neither program is actively supported.

Graphics file formats